Provincial elections were held in the Pakistani province of Khyber Pakhtunkhwa on 25 July 2018 to elect the members of the 11th Provincial Assembly of Khyber Pakhtunkhwa, alongside nationwide general elections and three other provincial elections in Sindh, Balochistan and Punjab. The remaining two territories of Pakistan, AJK and Gilgit-Baltistan, were ineligible to vote due to their disputed status.

Background
In the 2013 elections, Pakistan Tehreek-e-Insaf, led by former cricketer Imran Khan emerged as the largest party in the province with 48 seats. While this was a considerably higher number than the second largest party, (Jamiat Ulema-e-Islam (F), with 16 seats), it was still 15 seats short of a majority government.

To overcome this, Pakistan Tehreek-e-Insaf formed a coalition government with Jamaat-e-Islami and the Qaumi Watan Party, giving them 15 extra seats. As well as this, 9 out of the 14 independents elected joined PTI, giving them a comfortable majority in the assembly.

Following this, Pervez Khattak was elected as Chief Minister of Khyber Pakhtunkhwa, securing 84 out of 124 votes.

However, in 2017, PTI ousted QWP from the ruling coalition over allegations of corruption. There was considerable mistrust with the other alliance partner, JI, during the tenure as well. It, too, left the coalition with less than 40 days to go in the government's tenure.

With just a few weeks remaining till the assembly completed its term, PTI expelled 20 of its MPs over allegations of horse-trading in the senate elections. A move which made the party's government susceptible to a no-confidence motion, but the incumbent opposition refrained from doing so.

Pre-election violence 
On 10 July, there was a suicide bombing attack on political rally of Awami National Party (ANP) in YakaToot neighborhood of Peshawar in which fourteen people were killed and sixty five injured. Among the killed was ANP's Khyber Pakhtunkhwa Assembly candidate, Haroon Bilour. Bilour was son of Bashir Ahmad Bilour who was also killed in a suicide bombing attack in December 2012. Elections for Constituency PK-78 were postponed to an disclosed date by the Election Commission. On 12 July, a spokesperson for former Member of National Assembly Alhaj Shah Jee Gul Afridi was killed and another citizen was injured after unidentified men opened fire at the spokesperson's car in Peshawar.

On 13 July, 4 citizens were killed and 10 were injured after a planted bomb exploded near the car of JUI-F candidate Akram Khan Durrani in Bannu.

Results

Division-wise results

District-wise results

See also 
List of members of the 11th Provincial Assembly of Khyber Pakhtunkhwa (2018–2023)
2018 Pakistani general election
2018 Punjab provincial election
2018 Sindh provincial election
2018 Balochistan provincial election

References

2018 elections in Pakistan
Provincial election
2018
July 2018 events in Pakistan